The Angolan National Democratic Party (Partido Nacional Democrático Angolano) is a political party in Angola. The chairman of the party is Geraldo Pereira João da Silva and the general secretary is Pedro João António. In the 1992 presidential election the party supported the independent candidate Daniel Julio Chipenda.

In 1997 the party passed through some internal strife, at the time of its first national conference.

Sources

Political parties in Angola